The mottled owl (Strix virgata) is a medium-sized owl found in Central and South America from Mexico to Brazil and Argentina. The head and back are mottled brown and the underparts whitish, with vertical bars on the chest and throat. The eyes are dark and the head is round and they do not have ear tufts.

Taxonomy
The mottled owl was described by the American ornithologist John Cassin in 1849 and given the binomial name Syrnium virgatum. In 1999, Wink and Heidrich transferred it to the genus Strix, but this is still contested by some authorities.

Description

The mottled owl is a medium-sized owl with adults reaching  in length. Females are considerably larger than males; the mottled owl shows the greatest degree of sexual dimorphism of any species of owl. The crown, nape and back are mottled in several shades of darkish brown, the facial disc is pale brown and the throat, breast and belly are off-white with distinctive vertical brown streaks. The large eyes are brown, the beak is greyish-yellow or greyish-blue, and the legs and feet are greyish-yellow. There is a darker form of the bird with a buff breast and belly. Mottled owls produce a range of calls which include a hoot used in maintaining territory boundaries, and various whistles, screeches and hisses.

Distribution and habitat
The mottled owl is native to Central and South America. It inhabits a variety of wooded habitats including rainforest, woodland verges, dry thorn forest, pine/oak woodland and plantations and also open countryside with scattered trees. In some parts of its range it is common and it is often found close to human habitations.

Behaviour
The mottled owl is nocturnal and spends the day in dense vegetation where it may be mobbed by other birds. Its large eyes are adapted for sight at low levels of light, and its hearing is also acute. It is a predator and at night often perches on a branch beside a glade or at the edge of woodland on the lookout for prey. When it detects a small moving object, it swoops down from its perch on silent wings and pounces on its target, which may be a small mammal, a bird, reptile or amphibian or a large beetle, grasshopper or other insect/arthropod. It is known to prey on bats.

The mottled owl breeds between February and May in Colombia and in September to November in Argentina. It usually nests in a hole in a tree but may also choose an empty nest built by another species. One or usually two white eggs are laid and incubated by the female and both parents care for the young.

Status
The mottled owl has a very wide range and the number of individual birds has been estimated to be somewhere between five hundred thousand and five million. It is listed by the IUCN as being of "Least Concern" on the basis that, though its numbers may be decreasing slightly, they are not doing so at such a rate as would justify putting the bird in a more vulnerable category.

References

External links

 Mottled Owl photo at owlpages.com
 
 
 
 

Strix (genus)
Birds described in 1849
Taxobox binomials not recognized by IUCN